Macropharyngodon is a genus of wrasses native to the Indian and Pacific Oceans.

Species
The 12 currently recognized species in this genus are:
 Macropharyngodon bipartitus J. L. B. Smith, 1957 (Rare wrasse)
 Macropharyngodon choati J. E. Randall, 1978 (Choat's wrasse)
 Macropharyngodon cyanoguttatus J. E. Randall, 1978, 1978
 Macropharyngodon geoffroy Quoy & Gaimard, 1824 (Geoffroy's wrasse) 
 Macropharyngodon kuiteri J. E. Randall, 1978 (Black leopard wrasse)
 Macropharyngodon marisrubri J. E. Randall, 1978
 Macropharyngodon meleagris Valenciennes, 1839 (Blackspotted wrasse) 
 Macropharyngodon moyeri Shepard & K. A. Meyer, 1978
 Macropharyngodon negrosensis Herre, 1932 (Yellow-spotted wrasse)
 Macropharyngodon ornatus J. E. Randall, 1978 (False leopard)
 Macropharyngodon pakoko Delrieu-Trottin, J. T. Williams & Planes, 2014 (Pakoko wrasse)  
 Macropharyngodon vivienae J. E. Randall, 1978 (Madagascar wrasse)

References

 
Labridae
Marine fish genera
Taxa named by Pieter Bleeker